Filocalo Navigajoso (died 1214) was a Venetian (or possibly of mixed Greek and Venetian descent) nobleman and first Latin ruler of the island of Lemnos (known as Stalimene in Italian) in Greece.

Following the Fourth Crusade (1203–1204), most of the Aegean islands were apportioned to the Republic of Venice in the partition of the Byzantine Empire. Various Venetian nobles settled there and claimed the rule of these islands as fief-holders and vassals of the Latin Emperor at Constantinople. Filocalo received the rule of Lemnos and the title, borrowed from Byzantine court titulature, of megadux of the Latin Empire. He ruled the island from the fortress of Kastro or Palaiokastro (modern Myrina) until his death in 1214. Then the island was divided among his heirs. His son, Leonardo Navigajoso, received rule of one-half of the island with Kastro, and his two daughters received one quarter each, with the castles of Moudros and Kotsinos. The family's rule over the island lasted until 1278.

References

Sources
 
 
 

1214 deaths
Christians of the Fourth Crusade
Year of birth unknown
Medieval Lemnos
Republic of Venice nobility
Latin Empire people
13th-century rulers in Europe
Megaloi doukes